And Then Came Chet Atkins is a live album by guitarist Chet Atkins, released in 1979.

Track listing

Side one
 "Wheels" (Norman Petty) – 1:40
 "Vincent" (Don McLean) – 2:45
 "All Thumbs" (Mark Casstevens) – 2:20
 "Copper Kettle" (Albert Frank Beddoe) – 2:43
 "Bill Cheatham" (Arr. Chet Atkins, Rick Foster) – 2:03

Side two
 "Cascade" (Gene Slone) – 2:26
 "You'd Be So Nice to Come Home To" (Cole Porter) – 3:48
 "Snowbird" (Gene MacLellan) – 2:25
 "Dizzy Fingers" (Edward E. Confrey) – 2:35
 "Yakety Axe" (Spider Rich, Boots Randolph) – 1:53
 "Peanut Vendor" (Moises Simons, L. Wolfe Gilbert, Marion Sunshine) – 3:05

Side three
 "Autumn Leaves" (Joseph Kosma, Jacques Prévert, Johnny Mercer) – 3:12
 "When You Wish upon a Star" (Leigh Harline, Ned Washington) – 2:05
 "Blue Angel" (Nato Lima) – 2:15
 "Recuerdos de la Alhambra" (Francisco Tárrega) – 3:37
 "A Beatles Medley":
 a. If I Fell (Lennon-McCartney) - 1:05
 b. For No One (Lennon-McCartney) – 0:55
 c. Something (George Harrison) – 0:30
 d. Lady Madonna (Lennon-McCartney) – 1:05

Side four
 "Charade" (Henry Mancini) – 2:12
 "Black Mountain Rag" (Tommy Magnese) – 3:11
 "Drown in My Own Tears" (Henry Glover) – 2:27
 "Drive In" (Jerry Reed) – 2:03
 "Medley":
 a. Trambone (Chet Atkins) - 0:43
 b. Hello! Ma Baby (Joseph E. Howard, Ida Emerson) – 0:22
 c. I'll See You in My Dreams (Isham Jones, Gus Kahn) – 0:30
 d. The Poor People of Paris (Marguerite Monnot) – 0:50
 e. Mister Sandman (Pat Ballard) 0:35
 f. Freight Train (James-Williams) 0:55

Personnel
Chet Atkins – guitar
Henry Strezlecki – bass
Paul Yandell – guitar
Randy Goodrum - piano
Larry Londin - drums

References
Chet Atkins official website discography

Albums produced by Chet Atkins
1979 live albums
Chet Atkins live albums
RCA Victor live albums